Eddie Gordon is a British music business personality.

Eddie Gordon may also refer to:
 Eddie Gordon (fighter) (born 1983), Jamaican mixed martial artist
 Eddie Gordon (soccer), American soccer player
 Eddie Gordon (actor) in Sunset Murder Case
 Eddie Gordon, character in the episode "Bar Bet" in Cheers, portrayed by Michael Richards
 Eddie Gordon, character in Castle, portrayed by Neil Brown, Jr.
 Eddie Gordon, female character from series 9 of Casualty, portrayed by Joan Oliver

See also 
 Edward Gordon (disambiguation)